Wallpaper Music is the fourth studio album by the Nashville-based band Cheap Time. The single "Another Time", released in 2011, appears on the album. In the Red Records released the album in 2012. The catalog number is ITR-223.

Track listing
 "More Cigarettes" - 3:58
 "Straight and Narrow" - 2:18
 "Hall of Mirrors" - 3:42
 "Another Time" - 2:30
 "Take It If You Want It" - 3:34
 "Dream it Up" - 4:16
 "Night to Night" - 3:55
 "Witches in Stock" - 3:27
 "Typically Strange" - 4:25
 "Underneath the Fruit Flies" - 7:28

Personnel
Jeffery Novak - guitar, vocals
Ryan Sweeney - drums
Cole Kinnear - bass guitar, vocals

References

2012 albums
Cheap Time albums
In the Red Records albums